John Andrew Littlefield (born January 5, 1954) is a former Major League Baseball pitcher. He appeared in 94 games, all as a reliever. In 1980, he led the Cardinals with 9 saves and in games pitched, 52.

References

Sources

Major League Baseball pitchers
St. Louis Cardinals players
San Diego Padres players
Gulf Coast Cardinals players
Azusa Pacific Cougars baseball players
Johnson City Cardinals players
St. Petersburg Cardinals players
Arkansas Travelers players
Springfield Redbirds players
Syracuse Chiefs players
Baseball players from California
1954 births
Living people